John Patrick Hawthorne  (born 1964) is an English philosopher, currently serving as Professor of Philosophy at the Australian Catholic University in Melbourne, and Professor of Philosophy at the University of Southern California.  He is recognized as a leading contemporary contributor to metaphysics and epistemology.

Early life and career
Hawthorne was born on 25 May 1964 in Birmingham, England. He earned his PhD from Syracuse University, where he studied with William Alston and Jonathan Bennett. From 2006 to 2015, he was the Waynflete Professor of Metaphysical Philosophy at the University of Oxford. He has also taught at the University of New South Wales, Arizona State University, Syracuse University, Rutgers University, and Princeton University.

Philosophical work

Hawthorne's 2006 collection Metaphysical Essays offers original treatments of fundamental topics in philosophy, including identity, ontology, vagueness, and causation, which one reviewer called "essential reading for anyone currently engaged in analytic metaphysics".

In his book Knowledge and Lotteries, Hawthorne defends a view in epistemology according to which the presence of knowledge is dependent on the subject's interests (he calls this view "Subject-Sensitive Invariantism"). Unlike contextualism, Hawthorne's view does not require that the meaning of the word "know" changes from one context of ascription to another. His view is thus a variety of invariantism. However, whether a subject has knowledge depends to a surprising extent on features of the subject's context, including practical concerns. The American philosopher Jason Stanley holds a similar view.

Hawthorne has also written on philosophy of language and philosophical logic, philosophy of religion, philosophy of mind, and on Gottfried Wilhelm Leibniz.

Works

Books

 The Bounds of Possibility: Puzzles of Modal Variation, (with Cian Dorr and Juhani Yli-Vakkuri, Oxford: Oxford University Press, 2021)
 Narrow Content (with Juhani Yli-Vakkuri, Oxford University Press, 2018)
 The Reference Book (with David Manley, Oxford University Press, 2012)
 Relativism and Monadic Truth (with Herman Cappelen, Oxford University Press 2010)
 Metaphysical Essays (Oxford University Press, 2006)
 Knowledge and Lotteries (Oxford University Press, 2004)
 Substance and Individuation in Leibniz (with J. A. Cover, Cambridge University Press 2003)
 The Grammar of Meaning: Normativity and Semantic Discourse (with Mark Norris Lance, Cambridge University Press, 1997)

Edited books

 Knowledge, Belief, and God: New Insights in Religious Epistemology (edited with Matthew A. Benton and Dani Rabinowitz, Oxford University Press, 2018)
 Contemporary Debates in Metaphysics (edited with Theodore Sider and Dean Zimmerman, Blackwell, 2007)
 Perceptual Experience (edited with Tamar Gendler, Oxford University Press, 2006)
 Conceivability and Possibility (edited with Tamar Gendler, Oxford University Press, 2002)

References

External links
University of Southern California Webpage

Google Scholar Page

1964 births
20th-century English non-fiction writers
20th-century English philosophers
20th-century essayists
21st-century British non-fiction writers
21st-century English philosophers
21st-century essayists
Analytic philosophers
British male essayists
English essayists
English logicians
Epistemologists
Living people
Metaphysicians
Ontologists
Philosophers of language
Philosophers of logic
Philosophers of mind
Philosophers of religion
Philosophy academics
Philosophy writers
Syracuse University alumni
Waynflete Professors of Metaphysical Philosophy